is a 1971 Japanese yakuza film directed by Keiichi Ozawa. The revenge story of a man living in the world of a yakuza who was betrayed by his uncle and his brother.

Cast
 Tetsuya Watari as Takimura Shuji
 Yoshio Harada as Gōda Seijirō
 Masaya Oki as Takimura Hiroshi
 Ryōhei Uchida as Yusuke Sakashita
 Kōji Nanbara as Abe Tsunehisa
 Kenji Imai as Okawa Teruo
 Mitsuko Oka as Tachibana Yuki
 Harumi Sone as Kishimoto
 Shōsei Mutō as Morikawa
 Yoshiro Aoki as Shirato
 Hiroshi Mizuhara as Hanai
 The Mops as  Band Group
 Michitarō Mizushima as Tachibana Shigezaburō

References

Nikkatsu films
Yakuza films
Japanese crime films
1970s Japanese-language films
1970s Japanese films